The Gherăieşti gas field is a natural gas field located in Bacău, Bacău County. It was discovered in 2009 and developed by and Aurelian Oil & Gas. It began production in 2010 and produces natural gas and condensates. The total proven reserves of the Gherăieşti gas field are around 52 billion cubic feet (1.5 km³), and production is slated to be around 3.52 million cubic feet/day (0.1×105m³) in 2010.

References

Natural gas fields in Romania